Methyl hydroxychalcone is a chalconoid found in cinnamon. It was thought to be an insulin mimetic, improving insulin response of diabetics. It has since been determined that a flavonoid (cinnamtannin B1) is responsible for the insulin-like biological activity.

See also
 Anti-diabetic medication

References

Chalconoids